Ficus drupacea, also known as the brown-woolly fig or Mysore fig, is a tropical tree native to Southeast Asia and Northeast Australia (it has been introduced into the New World tropics, including Puerto Rico). It is a strangler fig; it begins its life cycle as an epiphyte on a larger tree, which it eventually engulfs. Its distinctive features include dense, woolly pubescence, bright yellow to red fleshy fruit, and grayish white bark. It can reach heights of 10–30 meters (33–98 ft). Its fruit are eaten by pigeons, and it is pollinated by Eupristina belgaumensis. It occurs in environments ranging from sea-level beachfront environments to montane forests, up to 1000 m (3281 ft).

Infraspecific taxa 
Varieties of F. drupacea include:

 Ficus drupacea var. auranticarpa (Elmer) Corner
 Ficus drupacea var. drupacea
 Ficus drupacea var. glabrata Corner
 Ficus drupacea var. pedicellata Corner
 Ficus drupacea var. pubescens (Roth) Corner
 Ficus drupacea var. subrepanda (Wall. ex King) D. Basu

References 

drupacea